Han Ying-chieh (January 1, 1927 – October 15, 1991) was a Hong Kong Chinese actor. He started acting from 1966 and acted in movies such as Come Drink with Me and others. He acted in some films with Bruce Lee such as The Big Boss and Fist of Fury and with Jackie Chan in New Fist of Fury. Ying-chieh has acted 60 movies from 1946 to 1991. His final performance was in The Swordsman (1990 film) as Huashan Sect elder Feng QingYang (風清揚).

Death 
In 1990, Han was rushed to a hospital in Hong Kong where he was diagnosed with cancer. He later succumbed to the disease on October 15, 1991, after a one-year battle. He was 64 years old. Han was buried in a Hong Kong Cemetery.

Selected filmography 

1950: Four Heroes of the Wang Family
1955: Fang Shi Yu yu Hu Hui Qian - Chamber guard
1961: Wen Ting Yu huo hai jian chou
1962: Ru yan jing hun - Choi Lung
1963: Liu Hai yu xian ji
1963: Hong Xian Nu ye dao bao he
1964: A Story of Three Loves (Part 1)
1964: A Story of Three Loves (Part 2)
1964: Between Tears and Smiles
1964: The Story of Sue San
1964: The Amorous Lotus Pan
1964: Lady General
1964: The Shepherd Girl
1965: The Mermaid - Prawn Spirit
1965: Sons of Good Earth
1965: The Lotus Lamp
1966: Das Schwert der gelben Tigerin - Bandit
1967: Angel with the Iron Fists
1967: The Iron Horse
1967: Tie ma yin ling
1967: Dragon Inn
1968: The Black Butterfly - 5th Chief Han Jie
1968: Jurang Bahaya
1968: Jue dou e hu ling
1968: The Angel Strikes Again
1968: Travels with a Sword
1968: Yu long yin
1968: Death Valley
1968: Killer Darts
1969: Tie gu chuan
1969: Luo Ma hu
1969: Dragon Swamp
1969: Killers Five
1969: Iron Bones
1970: The Eagle's Claw
1970: The Vietnamese Boxer
1971: The Invincible Eight
1971: The Big Boss
1971: The Angry River
1971: Die Todesfaust des Cheng Li - Hsiao Mi (The Boss)
1971: A Touch of Zen - Hsu
1972: Fist of Fury - Feng Kwai-sher (starring Bruce Lee)
1972: Iron Bull
1973: A Man Called Tiger - Lin Mu Lang
1973: Back Alley Princess - Boss Han
1973: The Fighter - Flucht ins Chaos - Golden Hair's No. 3 man
1973: None but the Brave - Secret policeman
1973: The Fate of Lee Khan - Sha Yuan Shan
1973: Fist of Shaolin
1973: Unsubdued Furies
1974: Da zhui zong - The Boss
1974: Shao lin gao tu
1974: Tornado of Pearl River
1974: Fists for Revenge
1975: Die Mutigen - Xu Dong
1975: The Golden Triangle
1975: Yi men zhong lie
1975: The Silent Guest from Peking
1975: Die Falle des gelben Drachen
1975: Heroes in Late Ming Dynasty
1976: The Himalayan
1976: Zwei Fäuste stärker als Bruce Lee
1976: Todeskommando Queensway
1976: Die Pranke des gelben Tigers
1976: Die Letzte Schlacht von Yang Chao - Chang
1976: One Armed Swordsmen
1977: Broken Oath
1977: The Martyrs
1977: Six Kung Fu Heroes
1978: The Prominent Eunuch Chen Ho
1978: Bruce Lee - Der reißende Puma - Han Tin Lung
1978: The Jade Hairpin Alliance
1979: Duell der 7 Tiger - Ting Ah-lung
1980: The Magnificent Kick - To Lo
1980: End of the Wicked Tigers
1984: Last Hero in Chin
1986: Xiong zhou - Li Ping
1987: Killer's Nocturne - Boss Cheung
1990: Meister des Schwertes

See also
Bruce Lee

References

Further reading
Lê Quang Thanh Tâm, Điện ảnh miền Nam trôi theo dòng lịch sử, Hochiminh City Culture & Arts Publishing House, Saigon, 2015
Phạm Công Luận, Hồi ức, sưu khảo, ghi chép về văn hóa Sài Gòn, Phuongnam Books & Thegioi Publishing House, Saigon, 2016–2022

1927 births
1991 deaths
20th-century Hong Kong male actors
Hong Kong stunt performers
Hong Kong male film actors
Hong Kong martial artists
Deaths from cancer in Hong Kong